Yücetepe is a village in Muş District, Muş Province, eastern Turkey. Its population is 1,117 (2021). It is located on the Murat river, 29 kilometers north of Muş.

Name
The official name of the village is the Turkish Yücetepe while the Kurdish inhabitants call it Derik.

History
A survey in 1902 estimated the population to be 102 Armenians and an estimate in 1910 concluded that figure had doubled. On the eve of The Armenian genocide the figure may have been as high 350.

The 1914 Armenian genocide removed the Armenian population and the town was repopulated with Kurds. In the year 2000 the population of the town was 2375, down from 1737 in 1997, mostly Kurds.

Economy
The economy of the village is based on agriculture and there is an active primary school in the village. The village has drinking water, sewerage (completed in 2001), electricity and fixed telephone. Also the road that provides access to the village is asphalt.

References 

Villages in Muş District
Towns in Turkey
Kurdish settlements in Turkey